KKDA-FM (104.5 MHz), known as K104, has been a leading radio station in the Dallas–Fort Worth metroplex for 46 years. It is a longtime heritage urban contemporary formatted station. It is owned by Service Broadcasting Corporation alongside KRNB. Its studios are located in Arlington, Texas, and the transmitter site is in Cedar Hill.

History
104.5 FM began operation on June 8, 1947, as KIXL.  KIXL (pronounced "Kicksil") aired a successful beautiful music format, simulcast on both 104.5 FM and 1040 AM ("104 on both dials"). A pioneer in the "mood music" format, the station showed up in the top five in Dallas market ratings consistently through 1968, but by the beginning of the 1970s KIXL was facing tough competition from KOAX, which had come to dominate as the top-rated easy listening station. In 1973, the year Dallas and Fort Worth were combined into one radio market, KIXL dropped its heritage calls in favor of KEZT, continuing to play easy-listening musical fare. The change did not improve the station's fortunes, as KEZT never appeared in the top 10 of the Dallas/Fort Worth ratings, while KOAX's success continued and KTLC provided additional competition in the beautiful music format.

On December 22, 1976, KEZT flipped to an Urban Contemporary format, changed their call letters as KKDA-FM and adopted the moniker K104, under the leadership of new owner Hyman Childs.  K104 was initially the FM counterpart to KKDA AM, which aired R&B and Soul during the day and Gospel at night. KKDA-FM primarily began as a disco station with the two slogans, "K104 Is Disco Soul!" and "K104 Is Disco!" Through the early to mid 1980s, KKDA-FM shifted to a Top 40/CHR/UC hybrid type format (also known as "Crossover" and "CHUrban", which is the predecessor to the current Rhythmic CHR format) while retaining the "K104" branding, first in 1983 with "K104, This Is It!", then later in 1985 with "K104, Jammin' With The Music!", and after that in 1987 with "K104, People Power!" In the late 1980's, the station was briefly known as "Hot 104, The All New KKDA-FM!", though the name would soon be dropped and returned to the "K104" branding under new slogan "K104, We've Got It Goin' On!" (During the station's disco era K104 had a mascot that billed itself as The K104 Disco Chicken).

Through the mid-1990s, under the leadership of new GM Ken Dowe and new PD Michael Spears, KKDA-FM skewed its former urban contemporary format with slower R&B and soul songs at night and gospel on Sunday mornings, towards the Mainstream Urban genre consisting of a Hip-Hop and current R&B heavy playlist. That format helped project K104 to being one of the highest-rated radio stations in the Dallas–Fort Worth DMA, where it has remained to this day.

Competitively, KKDA also has a current crosstown rivalry with another urban station KBFB ("97.9 The Beat"), who has taken advantage of KKDA's 'traditional' urban direction and used that to their advantage, resulting in the two fighting it out for R&B/hip hop dominance in the Metroplex. Their first competition until 1985 was the now defunct R&B radio station KNOK (which used the slogan "Disco and More"); their second competitor from 1988 until 1995 was station KJMZ (known as "100.3 Jamz"). In addition, they also once had a competitor in rhythmic contemporary rival KZZA ("Casa 106.7"), which had shifted from a Hispanic rhythmic direction, since KKDA also has a sizable share of Hispanic listeners.  However, KZZA is a rimshot signal. KNOR was considered a competitor from 2004-2006 as it was the only station in the Metroplex having a similar format to KKDA-FM's urban contemporary format.

As the FCC loosened radio station ownership rules with the passing of the Telecommunications Act of 1996, virtually all major market radio stations became part of large broadcast groups such as iHeartMedia, Cumulus, and others.  Today, KKDA-FM is one of the few remaining major market commercial stations in the nation that is still owned by a local, non-corporate broadcaster.

Its longtime morning drive show, Skip Murphy and the Home Team, was ranked number 1 during the morning drive time slot for nearly a decade, according to Arbitron ratings.  Over the last few years, several popular personalities on the show, such as comedian Nannette Lee and Wig, have moved on. The most recent personality to leave was Thomas "Skip" Murphy. He announced in July 2008 that he was moving to sister radio station KRNB to work weekdays from 3 pm to 7 pm. Nationally syndicated personality Tom Joyner became recognized as the "Fly Jock" because he hosted the morning drive slot on K104 and traveled regularly to host an afternoon drive slot on WGCI-FM in Chicago. His show was heard later on KRNB, and most recently aired on KZMJ.

Notable K104 Morning DJs

 Tom "The Fly Jock" Joyner 1983–1993
 Thomas "Skip" Murphy 1993-2008
 DeDe McGuire 2008-Today

See also
 KKDA (Classic soul)

References

External links
 
 DFW radio archives
 DFW Radio/TV history
 

Urban contemporary radio stations in the United States
KDA-FM
Radio stations established in 1947
1947 establishments in Texas